Stolow is a surname. Notable people with the surname include:

Albert Stolow (born 1959), Canadian physical and theoretical chemist
Henry Stolow (1901–1971), Latvian stamp dealer who did business in the United States and Germany

See also
Solow